Liu Ying (born 23 November 1985 in Jiangsu) is a female Chinese Olympic cross-country mountain bike racer, who competed for Team China at the 2008 Summer Olympics in where she finished 12th in the cross-country event.

Sports career

1998 Lianyungang Cycling Team;
2004 Jiangsu Provincial Team;
2005 National Team

Major performances

2007 National Championships - 1st mountain bike;
2007 Asian Championships - 1st mountain bike;
2007 Mountain Bike World Championships - 1st U23;
2007 World Cup - 1st mountain bike

References
 Profile Beijing 2008 Team China

1985 births
Living people
Chinese female cyclists
Sportspeople from Jiangsu
Olympic cyclists of China
Cyclists at the 2008 Summer Olympics
Cross-country mountain bikers
21st-century Chinese women